Him Loktantrik Morcha was a political front in the Indian state of Himachal Pradesh. HLM was formed ahead of the 2002 Shimla Municipal Corporation elections, as an alternative to both Indian National Congress and Bharatiya Janata Party. The convenor of HLM was Mohinder Singh Chaudhury. The front consisted of Communist Party of India (Marxist), the Janata Dal (Secular), the Lok Janshakti Party, the Samajwadi Party and a few secular regional parties.

Following dissatisfaction over Singh's move to make HLM into a political party, Samajwadi Party, Samajwadi Janata Party (Rashtriya) and Janata Dal (Secular) formed the Himachal Jan Morcha (Himalyana People's Front) in October 2002.

Singh later registered Loktantrik Morcha (Himachal Pradesh) as a political party.

Political parties in Himachal Pradesh
Political parties established in 2002
2002 establishments in Himachal Pradesh